3,4-Epoxycyclohexanecarboxylate methyl ester is a cycloaliphatic epoxide, which is added as monovalent monomer to other monomers for the production of crosslinked epoxy resins. 3,4-Epoxycyclohexanecarboxylate methyl ester itself would give a linear polymer when homopolymerized.

Production 
3,4-Epoxycyclohexanecarboxylate methyl ester is prepared by epoxidation of 4-cyclohexenecarboxylate methyl ester with peracid.

Properties 
3,4-Epoxycyclohexanecarboxylate methyl ester has a viscosity of 6 mPa·s.

References 

Carboxylate esters
Cyclohexanes
Epoxides
Methyl esters